Salatin may refer to:
Salatyn Asgarova, Azerbaijani journalist
Joel Salatin, American author
Salatın, village in Azerbaijan
Salatin, Iran, village in Kermanshah Province, Iran